Carlo Fontana (5 October 1865 – 16 November 1956) was an Italian sculptor. His work was part of the sculpture event in the art competition at the 1928 Summer Olympics.

References

1865 births
1956 deaths
20th-century Italian sculptors
20th-century Italian male artists
Italian male sculptors
Olympic competitors in art competitions
People from Carrara